Lew Wai Yip (born 19 September 1992) is a former Hong Kong professional footballer.

Honours

Club
Tai Po
 Hong Kong Sapling Cup: 2016–17

References

External links
 
 Lew Wai Yip at HKFA

1992 births
Living people
Hong Kong footballers
Association football defenders
Yokohama FC Hong Kong players
Tai Po FC players
Hoi King SA players
Hong Kong First Division League players
Hong Kong Premier League players